Bridget Boakye is a Ghanaian entrepreneur, data scientist and writer. She co-founded TalentsinAfrica, one of Africa's fastest-growing skills accelerator and recruitment platforms. Her company was among the top 20 companies selected in October 2019 for the Harambe Entrepreneur Alliance at Bretton Woods, New Hampshire. Her company also emerged as one of the top three start-up companies at the Oxford University Africa Innovation Fair.

Early years and education 
Bridget was born and raised in Ghana. She moved to the United States to live with her parents when she was ten years old and completed her her tertiary education at Swarthmore College, graduating with a bachelor's degree in economics.

Works 
After completing her tertiary education at Swarthmore College, she worked in development and education before moving to Ghana.

She was an editor at She Leads Africa where she mostly debated on African history, women, economics and entrepreneurship. In Ghana, she co-founded TalentsinAfrica and ChaleKasa. TalentsinAfrica is an AI-backed recruitment platform democratizing access to opportunity for young Africans, while ChaleKasa is a bespoke events company curating experiences to connect Diasporans and Africans. She is also the co-founder of the Women's Corner GH and the strategist for Africans on China.

Recognitions 

 She is an Amplify Africa Fellow 
 She is a member of the Global Shapers Accra Hub. 
 She was named a Frank 5 Fellow of Swarthmore College, 2018–2019
 Hamambe Alliance Entrepreneur Associate, 2019

Philanthropy 
During her 27th birthday, Bridget collaborated with Crowdfrica.org to create Bridget Gives @ 27, a fund raising project which she used to help raise $2,000 from her friends and family in support of providing healthcare to the people of Ohua Ghana.

References

Living people
Data scientists
Ghanaian businesspeople
Ghanaian women writers
Swarthmore College alumni
Year of birth missing (living people)